Hatem Abdulrahman (born 12 June 1995) is an Emirati footballer. He currently plays as a midfielder .

Career

Ajamn
Hatem Abdulrahman started his career at Ajman and is a product of the Ajman's youth system. On 23 October 2014, Hatem Abdulrahman made his professional debut for Al-Ain against Al Wahda in the Pro League, replacing Boris Kabi.

Masfout
On Season 2016 signed with Masfout.

References

External links
 

1995 births
Living people
Emirati footballers
Ajman Club players
Masfout Club players
UAE Pro League players
UAE First Division League players
Association football midfielders
Place of birth missing (living people)